Michael Pudlick is an American former ice hockey defenseman who was an All-American for St. Cloud State.

Career
Pudlick joined the men's program at St. Cloud State in 1998 after an underwhelming final season of junior hockey. He performed well as a freshman, leading the defensive corps in scoring, but the team did not have much success. The next season saw the Huskies make great strides, rising to third in the WCHA while Pudlick again the top defenseman for the team. Aside from improving his offensive output, Pudlick helped the team allow nearly 20 fewer goals and reach the NCAA Tournament for the first time since 1989. Pudlick was named an All-American and capitalized on the attention by signing a professional contract with the Los Angeles Kings after his sophomore season.

In three seasons with the Kings' AHL affiliate, Pudlick remained a depth defenseman and didn't get a chance to play with the parent club. Afterwards, he spent a year with the Portland Pirates, the farm team for the Washington Capitals. When the 2004–05 NHL lockout happened, he travelled to Germany and played for three teams over three seasons. he wrapped up his playing career with one final season in Norway in 2008.

Statistics

Regular season and playoffs

Awards and honors

References

External links

1978 births
Living people
AHCA Division I men's ice hockey All-Americans
American men's ice hockey defensemen
Ice hockey people from Minnesota
People from Blaine, Minnesota
St. Cloud State Huskies men's ice hockey players
Lowell Lock Monsters players
Manchester Monarchs (AHL) players
Portland Pirates players
Augsburger Panther players
Krefeld Pinguine players
Grizzlys Wolfsburg players
Stavanger Oilers players